A Mystery of Faith — Unreleased Pieces: Swans + World of Skin is a compilation album by Jarboe, released on January 25, 2005 by Atavistic Records.

Track listing

Personnel
Adapted from the A Mystery of Faith — Unreleased Pieces: Swans + World of Skin liner notes.
 Chris Griffin – mastering

Release history

References 

2005 compilation albums
Albums produced by Michael Gira
Jarboe albums
Atavistic Records compilation albums